András Száraz (born 2 March 1966 in Budapest) is a Hungarian former figure skater and current coach. He is an eight-time (1982-84 & 1986–90) Hungarian champion in singles. After his competitive career, he became a coach alongside fellow skater and ladies' national champion Eszter Jurek. His most notable skater was fellow Hungarian and 2004 European champion Júlia Sebestyén.

Results

References
 bio info

Navigation

Hungarian male single skaters
1966 births
Living people
Figure skaters from Budapest